Elections to Limavady Borough Council were held on 15 May 1985 on the same day as the other Northern Irish local government elections. The election used three district electoral areas to elect a total of 15 councillors.

Election results

Note: "Votes" are the first preference votes.

Districts summary

|- class="unsortable" align="centre"
!rowspan=2 align="left"|Ward
! % 
!Cllrs
! % 
!Cllrs
! %
!Cllrs
! %
!Cllrs
! % 
!Cllrs
!rowspan=2|TotalCllrs
|- class="unsortable" align="center"
!colspan=2 bgcolor="" | UUP
!colspan=2 bgcolor="" | SDLP
!colspan=2 bgcolor="" | Sinn Féin
!colspan=2 bgcolor="" | DUP
!colspan=2 bgcolor="white"| Others
|-
|align="left"|Bellarena
|38.9
|2
|bgcolor="#99FF66"|47.4
|bgcolor="#99FF66"|2
|0.0
|0
|13.7
|1
|0.0
|0
|5
|-
|align="left"|Benbradagh
|29.8
|2
|23.1
|1
|bgcolor="#008800"|32.0
|bgcolor="#008800"|2
|4.7
|0
|10.4
|0
|5
|-
|align="left"|Limavady Town
|bgcolor="40BFF5"|49.3
|bgcolor="40BFF5"|3
|28.2
|1
|0.0
|0
|10.6
|1
|11.9
|0
|5
|-
|- class="unsortable" class="sortbottom" style="background:#C9C9C9"
|align="left"| Total
|39.4
|7
|32.9
|4
|10.5
|1
|9.7
|1
|7.5
|0
|15
|-
|}

District results

Bellarena

1985: 2 x SDLP, 2 x UUP, 1 x DUP

Benbradagh

1985: 2 x UUP, 2 x Sinn Féin, 1 x SDLP

Limavady Town

1985: 3 x UUP, 1 x SDLP, 1 x DUP

References

Limavady Borough Council elections
Limavady